Grevillea micrantha, also known as small-flower grevillea, is a species of flowering plant in the family Proteaceae and is endemic to Victoria in Australia. It is a spreading shrub with linear leaves and clusters of white to pale pink flowers.

Description

Taxonomy
Grevillea micrantha was first formally described in 1854 by Carl Meissner in Linnaea: ein Journal für die Botanik in ihrem ganzen Umfange, oder Beiträge zur Pflanzenkunde. The specific epithet (micrantha) means "small-flowered".

Distribution and habitat
Small-flower grevillea grows in poor, stony soils in woodland in south-western Victoria in scattered populations in the area between the Brisbane Ranges, Wedderburn and Portland.

Conservation status
This grevillea is listed as "Rare in Victoria" on the Department of Sustainability and Environment's Advisory List of Rare Or Threatened Plants In Victoria.

References

micrantha
Flora of Victoria (Australia)
Proteales of Australia
Taxa named by Carl Meissner
Plants described in 1854